2:22 is a 2008 Canadian low-budget crime thriller directed by Phillip Guzman and starring Mick Rossi, Robert Miano, Aaron Gallagher, and Jorge A. Jiminez. The film premiered at the 2008 Santa Fe International Film Festival.

Premise 
Gully Mercer (Mick Rossi) leads a group of pro-league criminals (Robert Miano, Aaron Gallagher, Jorge A. Jiminez, and Val Kilmer) in the city of Toronto. They plan a seemingly "foolproof" heist for a lazy high-class hotel on New Year's Eve, set to take place at exactly 2:22 A.M. But when things go horribly wrong, friendship, loyalty and trust are pushed to the limit.

Cast 
 Mick Rossi as Gully Mercer
 Robert Miano as Willy
 Aaron Gallagher as Finn
 Jorge A. Jiminez as Gael
 Peter Dobson as Curtis
 Val Kilmer as Maz
 Bruce Kirby as Norman Penn
 Gene Burns as Rodney Rooney
 Luis Caldeira as Miller
 Sean Power as Rudy
 Sile Bermingham as Jody

Reception 
Steve Power of DVD Verdict gave a mostly positive review of 2:22, writing that the film compensated for a lack of budget with some striking visual flair, closing his statement with "2:22 is a surprisingly entertaining and gritty production. It doesn't add anything new to the crime genre, and the uneven performances certainly don't do the film any favors, but the direction is sound, the script is solid, and the flick has a great look for low budget fare." Mac McEntire, also from DVD Verdict, stated that 2:22 was an "okay" film, but one "that could have been a great movie". McEntire added that the part on the planned heist was cool and fun, but the drama that follows was cliché and hackneyed. Paul Mavis, a critic from DVD Talk, wrote a negative review of the film. He stated that the film was "tedious, overlong, and overly familiar", and ended with "everyone else can safely skip 2:22."

Film Critics United called 2:22 a "solid entry into the heist genre with its gritty look, well realized characters and its judicious use of violent imagery." Filmink was another reviewer which gave a negative review. It gave the film 1.5 (out of 5). The Los Angeles Times praised the visuals but found it unengaging and disappointing.

Accolades 
Following is a list of awards that 2:22 or its cast have won or for which they have been nominated.

 2009 Malibu Film Festival
 Best Picture Award 
 2010 Milan Film Festival
 Best Cinematography — Philip Roy

References

External links 
 Official website
 

2008 films
2008 crime thriller films
English-language Canadian films
2000s English-language films
Canadian crime thriller films
2000s Canadian films